Srimanmaharaja Samskrita Graduation and Post Graduation Center is an educational organization in Mysore, Karnataka, India.

History
Sanskrit College, Mysore was established by Krishnaraja Wodeyar III, maharaja of Mysore.  After his death, the next king Chamaraja Wodeyar formally opened a Sanskrit School in 1876.

Curriculum
The colleges offers courses in Veda, Agama and Shastra in traditional methods.  The campus contains one of the oldest collection of Sanskrit manuscripts. The courses in the college vary from two years to 13 years. The minimum age for enrolment is eight years.

Alumni
Notable alumni include Mysore M. Vasudevacharya, Dr. S.Radhakrishnan, Prof. S.Hiriyanna, Maharaja Jayachamaraja Wodeyar and Naveenam Venkatesha Sastry.

Courses offered
 Sanskrit Prathama. Three Years
 Kavya. Two years
 Sahithya. Three years
 Vyakarana, Nyaya, Meemaamsa, Dharma Sastra, Vishistadwaita, Shakti Vishistadwaita, Adwaita, Alankara (3 years each)
 Vidwat Madhyama (3 years)
 Vidwat Uthama (2 years)
 Rigveda, Shukla Yajurveda, Krishna Yajurveda, Sama Veda (13 years)
 Jaina Shaivagama, Vaikhasana Agama, Pancharathra Agama, Veerashaivagama and Jainagama (5 years each).

Fellowships
Students are admitted and instructed without charging any fee. Hostel facility is also free.

References

Universities and colleges in Mysore
1876 establishments in India
Educational institutions established in 1876